Mallig, officially the Municipality of Mallig, is a landlocked 4th class municipality in the province of Isabela, Philippines. The municipality has a land area of 133.40 square kilometers or 51.51 square miles which constitutes 1.07% of Isabela's total area. Its population as determined by the 2020 Census was 32,208.

Etymology
The town got its name after Mallig river that traverses the municipality.

History
The municipality of Mallig was named after the Mallig river that traverses it.  The area was first mentioned by Fray Pedro de Santo Tomas as the area to which the Irray/Gaddang fled after the revolt of Dayag and Catabay in 1621 in what is now Ilagan City.

In 1939, then President Manuel L. Quezon declared the westernmost part of the province as a resettlement area, historically known as the Mallig Plains Resettlement Area. From then on, the influx of settlers from the Central Plains and the Ilocos Region encouraged more other settlers to migrate westward in these Kalinga-dominated plains.

Mallig was created by virtue of RA 678 authored in 1952 by then Congressman Samuel F. Reyes. The act was approved on April 8, 1953, with the former barangay Olango as the seat of government.  The territory comprising Mallig was taken from several neighboring towns:
 from Roxas: barangay of Holy Friday, San Jose (East), and San Jose (West)
 from Ilagan: barangay of Casili, Olango Primero, Olango Segundo, San Jose Nuevo, and Manano
 from Tumauini: barangay of Barucbuc, Siempre Viva Norte , Siempr Viva Sur Bimmonton, Pasurgong, Manga, and Settlement No. 1
 from Santo Tomas: barangay of Abut and Minagbag

Mallig was never a ready haven and abode for the migrants at the beginning, particularly because of the hostile natives who formerly dominated the area, and also because of the occurrence of endemic malaria. It took the settlers gradual adaptation and acclimatization before they finally convinced their relatives and other migrants to settle permanently.

Geography
Mallig is bounded by the towns of Paracelis, Mt. Province on its western limits, Quezon, Isabela on its northern limits, Roxas, Isabela on its southern limits and by both Delfin Albano and Quirino, Isabela on its eastern limits. It is municipality within the Division/Province of Isabela in the region of Cagayan Valley.

Its main gateway is the Santiago-Tuguegarao road which is a part of the national highway. The Ilagan-Delfin Albano-Mallig road, a provincial road, also serves as an important point of entry to Mallig.

It is also an agricultural town mainly composed of agricultural farms such as rice fields and corn fields which makes its rural landscape.

Barangays
Mallig is politically subdivided into 18 barangays. These barangays are headed by elected officials: Barangay Captain, Barangay Council, whose members are called Barangay Councilors. All are elected every three years.

Climate

The climate in Mallig is tropical. Mallig has significant rainfall most months, with a short dry season. This location is classified as Am by Köppen and Geiger. The temperature here averages 27.0 °C. The average annual rainfall is 1784 mm.

Demographics

Economy 

Mallig is considered as one of the largest exporters of rice, corn, and tobacco in the Mallig Plains Region.

Major industries 

Mallig is one of the top producers of agricultural products in the province. Its principal crops is mainly rice but corn and tobacco are produced in quantity. The municipality is often referred to as the "rice and nateng capital of the province." Other major crops are mango, calamansi (calamondin orange), banana, peanut, and vegetables.

Government

Local government
The municipality is governed by a mayor designated as its local chief executive and by a municipal council as its legislative body in accordance with the Local Government Code. The mayor, vice mayor, and the councilors are elected directly by the people through an election which is being held every three years.

Elected officials

Congress representation
Mallig, belonging to the fifth legislative district of the province of Isabela, currently represented by Hon. Faustino Michael Carlos T. Dy III.

Education 
The Schools Division of Isabela governs the town's public education system. The division office is a field office of the DepEd in Cagayan Valley region. The office governs the public and private elementary and public and private high schools throughout the municipality.

Schools and Colleges

 Mallig Plains Colleges
 Mallig National High School
 Mallig Plains National High School
 San Jose National High School

References

External links
Municipal Profile at the National Competitiveness Council of the Philippines
Mallig at the Isabela Government Website
Local Governance Performance Management System
[ Philippine Standard Geographic Code]
Philippine Census Information
Municipality of Mallig

Municipalities of Isabela (province)